Jaganluy may refer to:
 Jaganluy-e Kord